Shari Lewis (born Phyllis Naomi Hurwitz; January 17, 1933 – August 2, 1998) was a Peabody-winning American ventriloquist, puppeteer, children's entertainer, television show host, dancer, singer, actress, author, and symphonic conductor. She was best known as the original puppeteer of the sock puppet Lamb Chop, first appearing on Captain Kangaroo in March 1956 and then the initial seasons (1957–1959) of Hi Mom, a local morning television show which aired on WRCA-TV in New York City.

Early life
Lewis was born Phyllis Naomi Hurwitz to Jewish parents, Ann (née Ritz) and Abraham Hurwitz, an education professor at Yeshiva University, who was originally from Vilnius, Lithuania. She had one sister, Barbara, who was nine years younger. Her parents encouraged her to perform and her father, who had been named New York City's "official magician" by Mayor Fiorello H. La Guardia during the Great Depression, taught her to perform specialized magic acts by the age of 13. She also received instruction in acrobatics, baton twirling, juggling, ice skating, piano, and violin.

Career
In 1952, Lewis and her puppetry won first prize on the CBS television series Arthur Godfrey's Talent Scouts. She hosted several New York children's series through the decade. On July 5, 1953, Lewis made her television hosting debut on Facts N'Fun on NBC-owned WRCA-TV. The program was a variety show in which she engaged her viewers and studio audience members in games, hobbies, craft making, songs, stories, informational segments, interviews with guest performers and personalities. She also performed witty comedy skits with two ventriloquist's dummies, Samson and Taffy Twinkle. The one hour show remained on the air until September 26, 1953.

She moved to WPIX in 1953 to replace Ted Steele as host of Kartoon Klub, which featured a variety format with a live studio audience. Lewis performed with Randy Rocket and Taffy Twinkle, and the program also featured reruns of Crusader Rabbit cartoons. Kartoon Klub later changed its title to Shari & Her Friends on September 23, 1956, and then to Shariland a month later. Lewis won New York-area Emmy Awards for her work on Shariland and a succeeding series on WRCA-TV, Hi Mom (1957–1959), which introduced Charlie Horse, Hush Puppy, and Wing Ding. Lamb Chop, also appearing, had previously been introduced during Lewis's guest appearance on Captain Kangaroo in March 1956.

NBC gave Lewis her first network program, The Shari Lewis Show, which debuted on October 1, 1960, replacing The Howdy Doody Show. The show ran until September 28, 1963, and featured such characters as Hush Puppy, Charlie Horse, Lamb Chop, and Wing Ding, a black crow. Lamb Chop, which was little more than a sock with eyes, served as a sassy alter-ego for Lewis. Hush Puppy had a Southern accent with a reserved, shy personality, while Charlie Horse was a slow-witted, goofy character.

In 1961, she played title character Dulie Hudson in Watching Out for Dulie, a United States Steel Hour production. She occasionally guest-starred in TV shows such as Car 54, Where Are You?, The Man from U.N.C.L.E., and Love, American Style.

From the late 1960s until the early 1980s, she appeared in a number of British shows, such as the Val Doonican Show and the Royal Variety Performance. In 1975, Lewis briefly hosted another, syndicated puppet show called The Shari Show. In 1992, her show Lamb Chop's Play-Along began a five-year run on PBS, created as an audience participation "anti-couch potato" show.

When Lamb Chop's Play-Along ended, Lewis and her husband Jeremy Tarcher created The Charlie Horse Music Pizza. A third of elementary schools were skipping music classes from their curriculum at the time, and Lewis and Tarcher felt they could introduce children to music through the show.

The faith-based video Lamb Chop's Special Chanukah was released in 1996 and received the Parents' Choice Award of the year. Lewis and Lamb Chop both appeared in a commercial for PrimeStar in 1997. When Lewis appeared before Congress in 1993 to testify in favor of protections for children's television, Lamb Chop gained permission to speak. An accomplished musician, she conducted major symphonies in the United States, Japan, and Canada. She wrote many books and produced 17 home videos.

Lewis's other work included providing the voice of Princess Nida in the cartoon segment Arabian Knights, part of the 1968 series The Banana Splits Adventure Hour. Her other voice work in animation includes Famous Studios' Honey Halfwitch theatrical cartoon shorts. Lewis voices the title character as well as her Cousin Maggie.

With her husband, Jeremy Tarcher, she co-wrote an episode for the original series of Star Trek, "The Lights of Zetar" (1969). Lewis wrote over 60 books for children.

Personal life
Lewis kept her surname from her first marriage to Stan Lewis (1932-1958). Her second husband was publisher Jeremy Tarcher (1932–2015), a brother of novelist Judith Krantz. Lewis met Tarcher on the set of a radio show; they married a year later. They had a daughter, Mallory Tarcher. 

Mallory Tarcher wrote for the shows Lamb Chop's Play-Along and The Charlie Horse Music Pizza. She legally changed her last name to Lewis and took over
her mother's work with Lamb Chop in 2000. On September 20, 2015, 17 years after her death, Shari Lewis's husband Jeremy Tarcher died from Parkinson's disease; he was 83. Prior to her death, Shari Lewis sold the rights to Lamb Chop to DreamWorks (now part of NBCUniversal). Her daughter Mallory still owns the live performing rights to the Lamb Chop character.

Illness and death
Lewis was treated for breast cancer in 1984. In June 1998, she was diagnosed with uterine cancer. She had a hysterectomy, but her doctors informed her that the cancer was inoperable and she was given six weeks to live. After her diagnosis, Lewis insisted on taping a final episode of The Charlie Horse Music Pizza. After recovering from the hysterectomy, she began chemotherapy at Cedars-Sinai Hospital. While undergoing chemotherapy, she developed viral pneumonia and died in the evening of August 2, 1998, at the age of 65. After her death, The Charlie Horse Music Pizza was canceled. The last episode of The Charlie Horse Music Pizza aired on January 17, 1999, on what would have been her 66th birthday.

Awards and honors
Lewis was the recipient of numerous awards during her lifetime, including:
 12 Emmy Awards
 Peabody Award (1960)
 Monte Carlo Prize for the World's Best Television Variety Show (1963)
 John F. Kennedy Center Award for Excellence and Creativity (1983)
 7 Parents' Choice Awards
 Action for Children's Television Award
 1995 American Academy of Children's Entertainment award for Entertainer of the Year
 Dor L'Dor award of the B'nai B'rith (1996)
 3 Houston Film Festival awards
 Silver Circle Award of the National Academy of Television Arts and Sciences (1996)
 Film Advisory Board Award of Excellence (1996)
 2 Charleston Film Festival Gold Awards (1995)
 Houston World Festival silver and bronze awards (1995)
 New York Film and Video Festival Silver Award (1995)
 In 1979, the Supersisters trading card set was produced and distributed; one of the cards featured Lewis's name and picture.
 In 1998, she was posthumously awarded the Women in Film Lucy Award in recognition of her excellence and innovation in her creative works which have enhanced the perception of women through the medium of television.

Television shows
 Shariland (1956–1958)
 Hi Mom (1957–1959)
 The Merv Griffin Show – 2 episodes (1962 and 1967)
 The Shari Lewis Show (1960–1963)
 Car 54 Where Are You – Puncher & Judy (4/7/63)
 The Danny Kaye Show – 2 episodes (1964)
 The Dean Martin Show – 2 episodes (1965–1966)
 The Shari Lewis Show (BBC) (1969–1976)
 Star Trek: The Original Series – Writer, The Lights of Zetar (1969)
 Shari's Show – TV Mini-Series (1970)
 The Shari Show (syndicated) (1975–1976)
 Dinah! – 2 episodes (1975–1976)
 Lamb Chop's Play-Along (1992–1997)
 Biography – Shari Lewis and Lamb Chop (1994)
 Where in the World Is Carmen Sandiego? –  The Hot Ice Heist (1994)
 The Nanny – Lamb Chop's On the Menu (1995)
 Sesame Street – Herself (1996)
 The Charlie Horse Music Pizza (1998–1999)

Feature films
 You Can Do It! – 1984
 Have I Got A Story For You – 1984
 Kooky Classics – 1984

Specials
 Macy's Thanksgiving Day Parade – 1975
 Macy's Thanksgiving Day Parade – 1976
 Shari Lewis Magic Show – 1979
 Shari's Christmas Concert – 1981
 101 Things For Kids To Do – 1987
 Lamb Chop's Sing-Along, Play-Along – 1988
 Don't Wake Your Mom! – 1989
 Lamb Chop in the Land of No Manners – 1989
 Macy's Thanksgiving Day Parade – 1992
 Macy's Thanksgiving Day Parade – 1993
 Lamb Chop in the Land of No Numbers – 1993
 Lamb Chop in the Haunted Studio – 1994
 Macy's Thanksgiving Day Parade –1994
 The 21st Annual Daytime Emmy Awards – 1994
 Lamb Chop's Special Chanukah – 1995
 Macy's Thanksgiving Day Parade – 1995
 Shari's Passover Surprise – 1996
 Kids for Character – 1996
 Macy's Thanksgiving Day Parade – 1996
 Macy's Thanksgiving Day Parade – 1997

Episodic TV appearances
 Lewis was included on the long list of entertainers who appeared on ABC's The Pat Boone Chevy Showroom, a variety series, which aired from 1957 to 1960. She was seen on the November 20 and December 18, 1958, episodes.
 Lewis appeared on April 14, 1960, and again on January 12, 1961, on NBC's The Ford Show, Starring Tennessee Ernie Ford.
 Lewis, Lamb Chop (dressed as Santa), and Charlie Horse sang "Jingle Bells" on The Ed Sullivan Show (Season 15, Episode 15, broadcast Dec 24, 1961)
 Lewis guest-starred in two episodes of the NBC police sitcom Car 54, Where Are You?, as Melinda Walsh in "How High is Up?" (1962) and as Judy Sanford in "Puncher and Judy" (1963).
 In "The Off-Broadway Affair", a season 3 episode of the NBC spy-adventure series The Man From U.N.C.L.E., Lewis guest-starred as a perky, somewhat ditzy understudy. Originally broadcast November 18, 1966.
 Lewis and Charlie Horse guest-starred in the season 4 episode "The Hot Ice Heist" of Where in the World Is Carmen Sandiego? in 1994 and gave a clue to the gumshoes. 
 Lewis and Lamb Chop guest-starred on Episode 2.20, "Lamb Chop's on the Menu", of the sitcom The Nanny broadcast on CBS, February 13, 1995.
 Lewis and Lamb Chop guest-starred on the 27th-season finale episode (Episode 3525) of Sesame Street, broadcast on May 17, 1996.
 Lewis and Lamb Chop guest-starred on Episode 3.14, "Little Bo Peep", of the sitcom Cybill broadcast on CBS, January 20, 1997.

Discography (selection)
 Fun in Shariland, originally released in 1958 on RCA Victor LBY-1006 and reissued on RCA Camden CAL-1006 in 1960
 Shari in Storyland, originally released in 1962 on RCA Victor LPM/LSP-2463
 Jack and the Beanstalk and Other Stories, originally released in 1964 on RCA Camden CAL/CAS-1052 (CD reissue: CAD1-1052)
 Give Your Child a Headstart, originally released in 1968 on RCA Camden CAL/CAS-1096 (CD reissue: CAD1-1096)
 Hi Kids! on Shout! Factory CD, originally released in 1952 on Golden Records
 Lamb Chop's Sing-Along, Play-Along, released in 1992 on A&M Records

References

External links

 

1933 births
1998 deaths
20th-century American actresses
20th-century American women writers
American puppeteers
American women screenwriters
American people of Lithuanian-Jewish descent
American women television personalities
Deaths from pneumonia in California
Deaths from cancer in California
Daytime Emmy Award winners
Peabody Award winners
People from the Bronx
Television personalities from New York City
Deaths from uterine cancer
Ventriloquists
Jewish American actresses
Jewish American entertainers
The High School of Music & Art alumni
American children's television presenters
Screenwriters from New York (state)
20th-century American screenwriters
20th-century American Jews